The  (OIF; sometimes shortened to the Francophonie, but also called International Organisation of  in English-language context) is an international organization representing countries and regions where French is a lingua franca or customary language, where a significant proportion of the population are francophones (French speakers), or where there is a notable affiliation with French culture.

The organization comprises 88 member states and governments; of these, 54 states and governments are full members, 7 are associate members and 27 are observers. The term  (with a lowercase "f"), or francosphere (often capitalized in English), also refers to the global community of French-speaking peoples, comprising a network of private and public organizations promoting equal ties among countries where French people or France played a significant historical role, culturally, militarily, or politically.

The modern organisation was created in 1970. Starting as a small group of French-speaking countries, the Francophonie has since evolved into a global organization whose numerous branches cooperate with its member states in the fields of culture, science, economy, justice, and peace.

History 
The convention which created the Agency for Cultural and Technical Co-operation (Agence de Coopération Culturelle et Technique) was signed on 20 March 1970 by the representatives of the 21 states and governments under the influence of African Heads of State, Léopold Sédar Senghor of Senegal, Habib Bourguiba of Tunisia, Hamani Diori of Niger and Prince Norodom Sihanouk of Cambodia.

Based on the sharing of the French language, the missions of this new intergovernmental organization are the promotion of the cultures of its members and the intensification of the cultural and technical cooperation between them, as well as the solidarity and the connection between them through dialogue.

The Francophonie project ceaselessly evolved since the creation of the Agency for Cultural and Technical Co-operation, it became the intergovernmental Agency of the Francophonie (Agence intergouvernementale de la Francophonie) in 1998 to remind its intergovernmental status. Finally in 2005, the adoption of a new Charter of the Francophonie (la Charte de la Francophonie) gives the name to the Agency of international Organisation of the Francophonie (Organisation internationale de la Francophonie).

Structure

Executive Secretariat (Secretaries-General)
The position of Secretary-General was created in 1997 at the seventh leaders' summit held in Hanoi. Canadian Jean-Louis Roy was secretary of the Agence de coopération culturelle et technique from 1989 until the formal creation of the Agence intergouvernementale de la Francophonie in 1997 with former Secretary-General of the United Nations Boutros Boutros-Ghali as the first secretary-general of La Francophonie. Abdou Diouf, the former president of the Republic of Senegal, became Secretary General on January 1, 2003. He was reelected on 29 September 2006, for a second mandate during the Summit of the Francophonie of Bucharest, and elected again in 2010 at the Summit of the Francophonie of Montreux for another mandate which ran until 31 December 2014. At the 2014 summit in Dakar, former Governor General of Canada Michaëlle Jean was chosen to lead the organization starting in January 2015.

The Secretary General of the Francophonie is elected during the Summit, and serves as the spokesperson and the official representative internationally of the political actions of the Francophonie. The Secretary General is responsible for proposing priority areas for multilateral Francophonie actions. Their job is to facilitate Francophone multilateral cooperation and to ensure that programs and activities of all operating agencies work in harmony. The Secretary General carries out their four-year mandate under the authority of the three main institutions of the Francophonie: the Summits, the Ministerial Conference and the Permanent Council.

Summits

The Summit, the highest authority in the Francophonie, is held every two years and gathers the heads of states and governments of all member states of the OIF around certain themes of discussion. It is chaired by the head of state or government of the host country and this person assumes that responsibility until the next summit. By enabling the heads of state and government to hold a dialogue on all international issues of the day, the summit serves to develop strategies and goals of the Francophonie so as to ensure the organisation's influence on the world scene.

Ministerial Conference
The Ministerial Conference of the Francophonie gathers the foreign or francophone affairs ministers of member states and governments every year to ensure the political continuity of the Summit. This conference ensures that the decisions made during the previous Summits are carried out and to plan the next Summit. It also recommends new members and observers to the Summit.

Permanent Council
The Permanent Council of the Francophonie gathers the Ambassadors of the member countries, chaired by the General Secretary of the Francophonie and under the authority of the Ministerial Conference, its main task is to plan Summits. This conference also supervises the execution of the Summit decisions made by the ministerial conferences on a day-to-day basis, about the examination of the propositions of the budget distribution.

Parliamentary Assembly
The objectives of the Parliamentary Assembly of the Francophonie  (APF) are to represent to the French-speaking authorities, the interests of the French-speaking communities, to promote the democracy, the rule of law and the respect of human rights. Furthermore, it follows the execution by the operators of the Francophonie of action plans elaborated by the Conference of the members using French as a common language It also favours the cooperation and strengthens the solidarity within the French-speaking communities, mainly towards the parliaments of the South. The Parliamentary Assembly of the Francophonie is constituted by member sections representing 77 parliaments or interparliamentary organizations. The Secretary General is the French senator Jacques Legendre.

Agency of the Francophonie
The Agency of the Francophonie is the main operator of the cultural, scientific, technical, economic and legal cooperation programs decided at the Summits. It is also the legal seat of the Secretary General and is used by him as an administrative support. The agency also contributes to the development of the French language and to the promotion of the diverse languages and cultures of its members, while encouraging mutual understanding between them and the Francophonie. For this reason, it is a place of exchange and dialogue and its simultaneous in Francophone countries.
The Agency's headquarters are in Paris and it has three regional branches in Libreville, Gabon; Lomé, Togo; and Hanoi, Vietnam.

Members 

Mauritania's membership was suspended on 26 August 2008, pending democratic elections, after a military coup d'état. Madagascar's membership was suspended in April 2009 due to an unconstitutional transfer of power on 17 March 2009. Mali's membership was also suspended in March 2012 due to a coup d'état, and then the Central African Republic was suspended for instances of la Francophonie at the 88th session of the CPF (March 2012), as well as Guinea-Bissau on 18 April 2012 for the same reason. Thailand, an observer nation, was suspended in 2014 following the 2013–14 political crisis. In 2018, Louisiana became the first US state to join, as an observer. In 2021, the government of Nova Scotia announced its intention to apply for observer status.

Although Algeria has one of the largest French-speaking communities in the world, it is not a member of the organisation.

Operating agencies
The International Organization of the Francophonie relies on five operating agencies to carry out its mandate: l’Agence Universitaire de la Francophonie (AUF); TV5Monde; l’Association Internationale des Maires Francophones (AIMF); l'Association des Fonctionnaires Francophones des Organisations Internationales (AFFOI); and l’Université Senghor d’Alexandrie.

Association of Francophone Universities (AUF)
Established in 1961 in Montreal, the Association of Francophone Universities gathers institutions of higher education and research among the Francophone countries of Africa, the Arab world, Southeast Asia, Central and Eastern Europe, and the Caribbean.

Its mission is to contribute to the construction and consolidation of a scientific space in French. It supports the French language, cultural and linguistic diversity, law and democracy, and the environment and sustainable development. It also provides an important mobility program for the students, the researchers and the professors.

Its mission is to support the French language and the linguistic diversity within International Organisations. Every year the association coordinates the day of French language within International Organisations. It also organizes seminaries to increase awareness about the importance of linguistic, cultural and conceptual diversity. The president is the French international civil servant Dominique Hoppe.

TV5Monde, the French-speaking international television
TV5Monde is the first international French language television network, available in many countries. On television and online the audience of TV5Monde has grown rapidly. TV5 is one of the three largest television networks in the world (along with the BBC and CNN), and is considered one of the greatest achievements of the Francophonie. It provides wide access to original television programmes in French, and contributes to the development of the language and French-speaking cultures. It broadcasts the different forms of the French language spoken around the world, with all their accents. It reaches beyond native speakers of French; the majority of those who can receive it and part of its audience comprise viewers for whom French is not the mother tongue. Thanks to subtitles in various languages, it provides access to the Francophonie to non-French speakers - it is translated into 12 languages.

International Association of French-speaking Mayors
The International Association of French-speaking Mayors was created in Quebec City in 1979 Jean Pelletier and Jacques Chirac, then the respective mayors of Quebec City and Paris with an initial group of 20 founder-cities. It is an operating agency for urban development gathering 48 countries or governments. The goal is to establish close cooperation in all areas of municipal activities. Its missions are to strengthen local democracy, building municipal capacities, and to support the populations. The association pursues its actions in the domains of health, culture, youth and education, urban development, training, and municipal infrastructures.

The association is presided by Anne Hidalgo (Paris' mayor) since 2009, with Pierre Baillet as permanent secretary.

Senghor University of Alexandria

The project of creating a French-speaking university in the service of African development was presented and adopted following the Dakar Summit in 1989. The Senghor University in Alexandria, Egypt is a private postgraduate institution that trains managers and high-level trainers in areas that are a priority for development in Francophone Africa. It directs the capacities of the managers and trainers to the action and the exercise of responsibilities in certain domains for the development: the project management, the financial institutions, the environment, the nutrition-health and of the cultural heritage. The Senghor University regularly organizes seminaries to help its students and of the public specialized in the domains of its action, by collaborating with the other operators and the institutions of the Francophonie.

Missions 

The International Organization of the Francophonie leads political actions and multilateral cooperation according to the missions drawn by the Summits of the Francophonie. The Summits gather the Heads of states and governments of the member countries of the International Organization of the Francophonie where they discuss international politics, world economy, French-speaking cooperation, human rights, education, culture and democracy. Actions of the International Organization of the Francophonie are scheduled over a period of four years and funded by contributions from its members.

The Charte de la Francophonie defines the role and missions of the organization. The current charter was adopted in Antananarivo, on 23 November 2005. The summit held in Ouagadougou, Burkina Faso on 26–27 November 2004 saw the adoption of a strategic framework for the period 2004–2014.

The four missions drawn by the Summit of the Francophonie are:
 Promoting French language and cultural and linguistic diversity.
 Promoting peace, democracy and human rights.
 Supporting education, training, higher education and scientific research.
 Expand cooperation for sustainable development.

French language, cultural and linguistic diversity
The primary mission of the organization is the promotion of the French language as an international language and the promotion of worldwide cultural and linguistic diversity in the era of economic globalization. In this regard, countries that are members of the Francophonie have contributed largely to the adoption by the UNESCO of the Convention on the Protection and Promotion of the Diversity of Cultural Expressions (20 October 2005).

At the national level, there is the problem of promoting the French language within the context of its co-existence with other partner or international languages in most member countries, especially in Africa. Maintaining the relative importance of the status of French is an imperative that requires solidarity and the pooling of means and resources among countries committed to the French language within their respective societies.

The Francophonie has been a pioneer in terms of the recognition of cultural diversity and dialogue of cultures. It must find ways of confronting the trend towards uniformity that accompanies globalization and fostering the preservation and development of cultural diversity.

Peace, democracy and human rights
Similar to the Commonwealth of Nations, the Francophonie has as its stated aims the promotion of democracy and human rights. Following the 3 November 2000 Déclaration de Bamako, the Francophonie has given itself the financial means to attain a number of set objectives in that regard.

The Francophonie intends to contribute significantly to promoting peace, democracy and support for the rule of law and human rights by focusing on prevention. Political stability and full rights for all, the subject of the Bamako declaration, are considered key to sustainable development.

The Francophonie has chosen to provide its member countries with access to the expertise of its extensive intergovernmental, institutional, academic and non-governmental network with a view to building national capacities, resolving conflict and providing support for ending crises.

In recent years, some participating governments, notably the governments of Canada and Quebec, pushed for the adoption of a Charter in order for the organization to sanction member States that are known to have poor records when it comes to the protection of human rights and the practice of democracy. Such a measure was debated at least twice but was never approved.

Supporting education, training, higher education and research
The International Organization of the Francophonie aims at connecting the various peoples using French as a common language through their knowledge. Education, like access to autonomy and information for all, begins with all children having access to a full primary education free of any inequality. It involves an integrated approach of teaching and training from primary to secondary school that will lead to employment. Education policies must also give French an integral place alongside the partner languages. Last, the research potential of French-language academic streams must be promoted.

Cooperation for sustainable development
The Francophonie is committed to working towards sustainable development by supporting the improvement of economic governance, capacity building, cooperation and the search for common positions in major international negotiations.
It's necessary to manage durably the natural resources, particularly the energy and the water, and politics are established to make sure of the conservation of these resources with effective anti-poverty campaigns.

In 2013, the United Nations Volunteers programme received a financial contribution from the Federal Public Service (FPS) Foreign Affairs, Foreign Trade and Development Cooperation of the Kingdom of Belgium for the years 2013 and 2014 to support the outreach to the francophone world and the promotion of volunteerism via its Online Volunteering service.

Criticism of the organisation

Proliferation of non-Francophone member states and missions
The membership of the OIF has climbed from 21 in 1970 to 88 member states and territories in 2018. This sharp increase in the number of member states, many of whom have only the remotest connection with the French language and culture, has been a matter of growing concern. In their 1996 study on the Francophone space, linguists Daniel Baggioni and Roland Breton pointed out, alluding to the recent applications of Bulgaria and Angola to join the OIF, that only politico-diplomatic criteria could explain these odd extensions of the OIF. Xavier Deniau, founder of the Association des parlementaires de langue française (now the Parliamentary assembly) and author of La Francophonie, expressed concern that the enlargement of the OIF to countries where French is practically nonexistent risks diluting the effectiveness of the organisation. Despite calls for a moratorium on the admission of new members, each new Sommet de la Francophonie has witnessed the admission of batches of new members that have little, if anything, to do with the French language: Bosnia-Herzegovina, the Dominican Republic, the United Arab Emirates, Estonia and Montenegro in 2010; Qatar and Uruguay in  2012; Mexico, Costa Rica and Kosovo in 2014. On that occasion, the Montreal daily Le Devoir, which reports extensively on the OIF and its summits, remarked that several members of this "merry madhouse" that the OIF had become did not even recognise Kosovo as a country. The “endless enlargement” of the Organisation accelerated following the arrival at the head of the OIF of former UN Secretary General Boutros-Ghali who declared early in his term in 1998 that French being in his opinion the language of solidarity, tolerance, respect for the individual, cultural diversity, universality and openness, the OIF needed to open itself to non francophones. The motivation of small and mid-size countries in joining the organisation appears to be a desire to increase their international visibility. In October 2018, the Irish Minister of State for European Affairs explained that Ireland's accession to the OIF with observer status was one of the steps set out in 'Global Ireland', the Government's initiative to double the scope and impact of Ireland's global footprint in the period to 2025.

Following the arrival of Boutros-Ghali, the OIF had also seen a steady increase in the number of its missions and priority action areas — peace and conflict prevention, human rights, democracy, international cooperation, sustainable development, cultural and linguistic diversity, education and training, youth, gender equality, civil society — bringing a fundamental shift from the cultural to the political sphere. Jacques Legendre, the French senate's rapporteur on the Francophonie, expressed his concern that the OIF was becoming "a second-rate duplicate of the General Assembly of the UN". Many actors of the francophone sphere interested in the future of the organisation, including Former French ministers or secretaries of state for the Francophonie such as Pierre-André Wiltzer and Jean-Baptiste Lemoyne, have been calling on the OIF to refocus on its fundamentals: language and culture.

Disregard for human rights and fundamental freedoms
Human rights and fundamental freedoms, despite having been declared "categorical imperatives" by Secretary General Boutros-Ghali in 1998, are routinely abused by many members states of the OIF. The deplorable track record of many OIF member states regarding human rights came to the fore during the 1999 Francophonie Summit in Moncton, Canada, when Canadian dailies loudly denounced the organisation's silence regarding widespread human rights abuses by member states ruled by "tyrants". It was pointed out that no less than 35 member states of the OIF had been accused of human rights violations by Amnesty International, while 15 member states were among the countries listed by Reporters Without Borders as systematically violating freedom of the press. Prime Minister Chrétien and President Chirac felt compelled to declare at the close of the summit that a human rights observatory would be established to tackle the problem. Given that during his 12-year tenure, President Chirac, dubbed Papa Afrique or Chirac l'Africain, had confided more than once that Africa was not ready for multipartism (l'Afrique n'est pas mûre pour le multipartisme) and was known for his close relationship with many entrenched African strongmen, calling Omar Bongo of Gabon, Gnassingbé Eyadéma of Togo, Denis Sassou Nguesso of the Republic of the Congo and Blaise Compaoré of Burkina Faso "personal friends", nothing came out of this declaration. The French daily Le Monde noted at the time that if respect for fundamental freedoms was to become a criterion for membership in the OIF, the organisation would simply cease to exist.

French President Macron's surprise announcement in May 2018 that France officially backed the nomination of Louise Mushikiwabo, Rwanda's longtime foreign minister, as the next secretary general of the OIF was seen by many as a setback for the defense and promotion of human rights. An open letter signed by four former French ministers for international cooperation condemned this move, on one hand because it was taken unilaterally by the French president without consultation with the other member states of the organisation and on the other because it disregarded President Kagame’s lamentable track record on human rights. "How will the Francophonie be able to promote freedom of the press, as part of its mission of advocating for human rights, if it's headed by one of the key leaders of a country that's trampled on media freedom and repressed journalists for 18 years?" asked Christophe Deloire, secretary general of Reporters Without Borders.

See also 

 Agence de coopération culturelle et technique
 Minister responsible for La Francophonie (Canada)
 Jeux de la Francophonie
 International Francophonie Day (Journée internationale de la Francophonie)
 Conseil international de la langue française
 French immersion
 Alliance française
 Espace Francophone pour la Recherche, le Développement et l'Innovation
 Journée internationale de la Francophonie (March 20)
 Francophone
 French colonial empire
 Geographical distribution of French speakers
 French in Africa
 French in India
 French in the United States
 Franco-Canadian relations
 French America
 Vietnamese French
 Lao French
 Cambodian French
 List of countries where French is an official language
 List of international organisations which have French as an official language
 List of French possessions and colonies
 Three Linguistic Spaces

Notes

References

Further reading 
 Glasze, Georg (2007): "The Discursive Constitution of a World-spanning Region and the Role of Empty Signifiers: the Case of Francophonia." In: Geopolitics (12)4: 656–679. (pdf: Wayback Machine'')
 Milhaud, Olivier (2006): "Post-Francophonie?". EspacesTemps.net. Post-Francophonie?

External links

  
  
  MaVieFrancaise.org, a social network for Francophiles, Francophones and those learning French (features articles and interviews).
 L'Assemblée des Francophones Fonctionnaires des Organisations Internationales (AFFOI) is the assembly of French speaking international civil servants.

 
 
International organisations based in Paris
Organizations established in 1970
United Nations General Assembly observers
International cultural organizations
Language advocacy organizations
Language education organizations
European civilizations
Modern civilizations